Ayana Holloway Arce is a Professor of Physics at Duke University. She works on particle physics, using data from the Large Hadron Collider to understand phenomena beyond the Standard Model.

Early life and education 
Arce was born in Lansing, Michigan. She studied physics at Princeton University, graduating with honors and a bachelor's degree in 1998. She moved on to Harvard University for her PhD, working the Collider Detector at Fermilab (CDF) detector at Fermi National Accelerator Laboratory. She completed her PhD in 2006.

Research 
After her PhD, Arce completed a Chamberlain post-doctoral fellowship at Lawrence Berkeley National Laboratory, where she worked on experimental techniques to measure properties of heavy unstable particles. Arce joined Duke University in 2010 and was made a Woodrow Wilson Foundation Fellow in 2012. Her mother, Karla F.C. Holloway, is a Professor of English and Law, and her father Russell Holloway is the Dean for Corporate and Industrial Relations. Arce is working on the calorimeter detector at the ATLAS experiment. She is working on jet substructure reconstruction, and the use of jet tagging in diboson resonances.

In 2017 Arce and her mother, Karla F.C. Holloway, were involved in Duke University's commemorations of 50 years of Black faculty scholarship. She was excited by the film Hidden Figures and has taken part in national discussions looking at how to engage more people of colour in scientific careers. She is part of the Triangle Universities Nuclear Laboratory research consortium, which supports undergraduate students to complete summer research projects in nuclear and particle physics.

References

External links 
 SCHOLARS@DUKE

Theoretical physicists
Particle physicists
Harvard University alumni
Princeton University alumni
Duke University faculty
21st-century American physicists
21st-century American women scientists
American women physicists
People from Lansing, Michigan
Scientists from Michigan
African-American women scientists
American women academics
21st-century African-American women
21st-century African-American scientists